A bird's-eye view is an elevated view of an object or location from a very steep viewing angle, creating a perspective as if the observer were a bird in flight looking downwards. Bird's-eye views can be an aerial photograph, but also a drawing, and are often used in the making of blueprints, floor plans and maps. 

Before crewed flight was common, the term "bird's eye" was used to distinguish views drawn from direct observation at high vantage locations (e.g. a mountain or tower), from those constructed from an imagined bird's perspectives. Bird's eye views as a genre have existed since classical times. They were significantly popular in the mid-to-late 19th century in the United States and Europe as photographic prints.

Terminology 
The terms aerial view and aerial viewpoint are also sometimes used synonymous with bird's-eye view. The term aerial view can refer to any view from a great height, even at a wide angle, as for example when looking sideways from an airplane window or from a mountain top. Overhead view is fairly synonymous with bird's-eye view but tends to imply a vantage point of a lesser height than the latter term. For example, in computer and video games, an "overhead view" of a character or situation often places the vantage point only a few feet (a meter or two) above human height. See top-down perspective.

Recent technological and networking developments have made satellite images more accessible. Microsoft Bing Maps offers direct overhead satellite photos of the entire planet but also offers a feature named Bird's eye view in some locations. The Bird's Eye photos are angled at 40 degrees rather than being straight down. Satellite imaging programs and photos have been described as offering a viewer the opportunity to "fly over" and observe the world from this specific angle.

In filmmaking and video production, a bird's-eye shot refers to a shot looking directly down on the subject. The perspective is very foreshortened, making the subject appear short and squat. This shot can be used to give an overall establishing shot of a scene, or to emphasise the smallness or insignificance of the subjects. These shots are normally used for battle scenes or establishing where the character is. It is shot by lifting the camera up by hands or by hanging it off something strong enough to support it. When a scene needs a large area shot, it is a crane shot.

Bird's-eye views are common in the broadcasting of sports events, especially in the 21st century, with the increased usage of the Skycam and other devices like it, such as the CableCam and Spidercam.

Gallery

Bird's-flight view 

A distinction is sometimes drawn between a bird's-eye view and a bird's-flight view, or "view-plan in isometrical projection". Whereas a bird's-eye view shows a scene from a single viewpoint (real or imagined) in true perspective, including, for example, the foreshortening of more distant features, a bird's-flight view combines a vertical plan of ground-level features with perspective views of buildings and other standing features, all presented at roughly the same scale. The landscape appears "as it would unfold itself to any one passing over it, as in a balloon, at a height sufficient to abolish sharpness of perspective, and yet low enough to allow of distinct view of the scene beneath". The technique was popular among local surveyors and cartographers of the sixteenth and early seventeenth centuries.

See also

 Aerial landscape art
 Aerial perspective (disambiguation)
 Aerial photography
 Archimedean point
 Camera angle
 Cinematic techniques
 Filmmaking
 Google Earth
 Pictorial map
 Pictometry
 Plans (drawings)
 Top-down perspective
 Video production
 Worm's-eye view

References 

Technical drawing
Cartography
Methods of representation
Metaphors referring to birds